Cabobanthus bullulatus is a plant in the family Asteraceae, native to tropical Africa.

Description
The capitula feature about 10 mauve florets. The fruits are achenes.

Distribution and habitat
Cabobanthus bullulatus is native to the Democratic Republic of the Congo, Angola and Zambia.

References

Vernonieae
Flora of the Democratic Republic of the Congo
Flora of Angola
Flora of Zambia
Plants described in 1927